Black and Blue is a 2019 American action thriller film directed by Deon Taylor from a screenplay by Peter A. Dowling. The film stars Naomie Harris, Tyrese Gibson, Frank Grillo, Mike Colter, Reid Scott, and Beau Knapp, and follows a rookie police officer who goes on the run after she witnesses her colleagues commit a murder.

The film had its world premiere at the Urbanworld Film Festival on September 21, 2019, and was theatrically released in the United States on October 25, 2019, by Sony Pictures Releasing. It received mostly mixed reviews from critics.

Plot
U.S. Army veteran Alicia West returns to her hometown of New Orleans, where she joins the city's police department and is partnered with the easygoing Kevin Jennings. Their beat includes the deprived slum neighborhood where West grew up, and during one patrol she meets an old friend, Milo "Mouse" Jackson, who now works as a convenience store clerk. However, he acts as if he doesn't know her, as the community is deeply distrustful of the police.

In order for Jennings to get home to date-night with his wife, West takes his place in a double shift with another patrolman, Deacon "Deek" Brown. During their shift he gets a call on his personal phone and drives to a derelict power station, ostensibly to meet an informant named Zero; when they arrive, he orders West to wait in the car while he heads in alone. Soon afterward, West hears gunfire coming from the building and rushes in to help, wearing a bulletproof vest fitted with a body camera, only to stumble upon Brown and two narcotics detectives, Terry Malone and Smitty, executing three unarmed drug pushers in cold blood after a botched drug deal. Malone attempts to explain away the incriminating situation, but Smitty panics upon seeing West's bodycam and shoots her. She is protected by her vest but stumbles backward onto a weak section of flooring and falls several stories.

Despite being badly injured in the fall, West manages to escape, with Malone, Smitty and Brown in pursuit. She flags down a passing squad car and asks for help from the two patrolmen inside, but quickly realizes that they are also part of Malone's network of corrupt cops, forcing her to flee again. She eventually finds sanctuary in the store where Mouse works, though he is at first reluctant to help and considers turning her over to her pursuers. Unsure who in the police department she can trust, West calls the off-duty Jennings and asks him to give her a lift to a police station so that she can upload her bodycam footage to the police mainframe and thereby get incontrovertible evidence against Malone and his cohorts on the record. However, during the drive Jennings inadvertently reveals that he already knew Malone was crooked, and West, realizing that he intends to set her up, slugs him and leaves him handcuffed to the steering wheel.

Malone frames West for the shootings at the power station; drug kingpin Darius Tureau, whose nephew Zero was one of the victims, puts out a hit on West. Hunted by both the police and Darius' gang, West is again forced to seek shelter from Mouse, this time at his apartment. He takes her in, but his neighbor tips off the gangsters, who try to kill her. She manages to escape, but Mouse is captured. Unwilling to leave Mouse to his fate, West surrenders to Darius, explaining that she has proof of her innocence in the form of her bodycam footage. Darius has his computer expert hack the bodycam and learns the truth. 

Before Darius can act on this revelation, however, the police raid the apartment block. In the confusion of the raid Smitty kills Brown (in revenge for an earlier spat over who was to blame for the fiasco at the power station) and is then killed himself by West, while Malone kills Darius and most of his gang and begins searching the block for West. Knowing that she cannot escape, West gives the bodycam and her jacket to Mouse, who with this disguise is able to slip through the police cordon, steal Malone's car, and race to the police station, where he uploads the bodycam footage to the mainframe.

Back at the apartment block, Malone manages to corner West, leading to a hand-to-hand struggle which eventually takes them out onto the courtyard in front of a crowd of local residents. West manages to get hold of Malone's gun but is forced to drop it when armed police arrive to break up the fight. However, at that moment the precinct captain, having seen the vital bodycam footage, radios the SWAT team and orders them to stand down. Malone tries to kill West with his gun, but he is shot and incapacitated by Jennings, West's repentant partner.

The wounded Malone is arrested and charged for the murders of the three drug dealers, while West's name is cleared, earning her the respect both of her fellow police officers and of her old neighborhood. Sometime later, she visits her mother's grave with Mouse. Mouse tells her he owes her his life and kisses her on the forehead in thanks, and the two leave together.

Cast
 Naomie Harris as Alicia West
 Tyrese Gibson as Milo / Mouse Jackson
 Frank Grillo as Terry Malone
 Mike Colter as Darius Tureau
 Reid Scott as Kevin Jennings
 Beau Knapp as Smitty
 Nafessa Williams as Missy
 James Moses Black as Deacon Brown
 Carsyn Taylor as Jamal
 Deneen Tyler as Captain Regina Hackett
 Michael Papajohn as Sergeant Leader
 Nelson Bonilla as Doyle
 Frankie Smith as Tez
 John Charles II as Zero

Production
In August 2017, it was announced Screen Gems had acquired Peter A. Dowling's spec script Exposure, and Sean Sorensen would produce the film under his Royal Viking Entertainment banner. In August 2018, it was announced Deon Taylor would direct the film, and Roxanne Avent would serve as an executive producer under her Hidden Empire Film Group banner. In December 2018, Naomie Harris joined the cast of the film, which was retitled from Exposure to Black and Blue. In January 2019, Frank Grillo, Reid Scott, Tyrese Gibson, Beau Knapp, Mike Colter and Nafessa Williams joined the cast of the film. In March 2019, James Moses Black joined the cast of the film. In April 2019, Frankie Smith joined the cast of the film.

Filming
Principal photography began on January 16, 2019, and concluded on February 28, 2019.
The movie was shot using CineAlta cameras, Sony α7S II and Sony Xperia 1 smartphones. All these devices are marketed and manufactured by Sony, the parent company of Sony Pictures and Screen Gems.

Release
Black and Blue had its world premiere at the Urbanworld Film Festival on September 21, 2019. It was released on October 25, 2019. It was previously scheduled to be released on September 20, 2019.

Reception

Box office
In the United States and Canada, Black and Blue was released alongside The Current War and Countdown, and was projected to gross $8–11 million from 2,062 theaters in its opening weekend. It made $3.1 million on its first day, including $675,000 from Thursday night previews. It went on to debut to $8.3 million, finishing sixth; social media monitor RelishMix said the low figure was blamed on audiences being "bored with this type of cop thriller". In its second weekend the film fell 50% to $4.1 million, finishing eighth.

Critical response
The site's critics consensus reads, "Black and Blue is elevated by Naomie Harris' central performance, even if the end result suffers from a simplistic treatment of topical themes." On Metacritic, the film has a weighted average score of 54 out of 100, based on 23 critics, indicating "mixed or average reviews". Audiences polled by CinemaScore gave the film a grade of "A−" on an A+ to F scale, while those surveyed at PostTrak gave it an overall positive score of 80%, including an average 4 out of 5 stars.

Candice Frederick of TheWrap wrote, "Black and Blue is chock-full of heart-pounding car chases and suspenseful moments that are certain to entertain mainstream audiences, but the film falters when it attempts, beyond its title, to reflect a necessary and under-discussed conversation about societal issues."

See also
 21 Bridges
 List of black films of the 2010s

References

External links
 
 
 

2019 films
2019 action thriller films
2019 crime thriller films
American action thriller films
American crime thriller films
Fictional portrayals of the New Orleans Police Department
Films about corruption in the United States
Films about police brutality
Films about police misconduct
Films directed by Deon Taylor
Films scored by Geoff Zanelli
Films set in New Orleans
Films shot in New Orleans
Hood films
Screen Gems films
Films about police corruption
2010s English-language films
2010s American films